The Florida International University Alumni Association is an alumni organization for former students of Florida International University. It is governed by a 32 volunteer member Board of Directors and currently has over 20,000 dues paying members made up of alumni, students, faculty/staff and friends of FIU.

Signature events

Torch Awards Gala
Each year, the FIU Alumni Association recognizes outstanding alumni at the Annual Torch Awards Gala which was established on FIU's 25th anniversary. During the 14th Annual Gala, which took place on March 28, 2015, at the Fontainebleau Miami Beach, the FIU Alumni Association broke a university record with over 800 guests in attendance and commemorated the university's 50th anniversary. The gala boasts an attendance of university leadership, high-level donors, alumni and friends of FIU.

The awards categories include:
 Alumnus/a of the Year Award presented to an outstanding alumnus/a who has been a dedicated contributor to their field, alma mater and community
 Chuck Perry Young Alumni Visionary Award presented to an alumnus/a who has made great strides in the early stages of his/her career
 Community Leadership Award presented to an alumnus/a who has demonstrated exemplary service and civic involvement in his/her community
 Outstanding Faculty Award presented to a faculty member who has made a lasting impression on the lives of FIU alumni
 Distinguished Alumni Awards recognize alumni who have brought honor and distinction to the university through their notable record of service and achievement in a particular discipline, organization or cause

FIU Scholarship Fishing Tournament & Block Party
The Florida International University Scholarship Fishing Tournament is a one-day, offshore tournament featuring fishing for Dolphin. The university's Alumni Association organizes this event and the NET proceeds go towards a scholarship program for students of the university. In addition to recognizing Alumni Association scholarship recipients, the Dock Party is open to the public and features unlimited drinks and food sponsored by local restaurants, music and activities for kids. The Student Alumni Association hosts a PAW Wall at the event which features a wall of numbered Paws, which correspond to different prizes. Guests can contribute a donation to select a paw, which will win them a mystery prize guaranteed to be valued higher than the cost of the paw. The funds raised by the surprise raffle wall go directly to the student scholarship fund.

The prize categories include:
 Most Aggregate Dolphin Weight
 2nd Place Most Aggregate Dolphin Weight
 Largest Dolphin
 2nd Place Largest Dolphin
 Largest Junior
 2nd Place Largest Junior
 Largest Ladies Dolphin
 Largest Fun Fish

Other annual events
The Alumni Association also hosts smaller scale annual events to provide their alumni base with a variety of networking options. These range from receptions and meetings to luxury tailgates and reunions.
 Annual Meeting and Cocktail Reception
An exclusive members-only reception that provides networking opportunities with fellow alumni and university leadership. During this event, an induction ceremony takes place for any new members of the Alumni Association Board of Director.
 Panther Alumni Week & Closing Reception
A week of service during which alumni are invited to return to campus as guest speakers to inspire students at the start of their academic career. The Alumni Association also hosts a reception at the end of the week for the participating alumni to enjoy food, beverages and listen to an update on FIU from the university's president, Mark B. Rosenberg.
 Roar Lounge
An exclusive, air-conditioned luxury tailgate that allows guests to escape from the masses and enjoy food, beverages, music and networking prior to select football games.
 Silver Pride Reunion
The event honors those who graduated 25 years and prior and invites them back for a reunion weekend where they can reconnect with their fellow panthers and enjoy a variety of activities, including an induction ceremony, dinner, football game and campus tour.
 Worlds Ahead Tour
The Alumni Association travels to cities with large pockets of alumni and hosts an intimate cocktail reception to show them what is on the next horizon for FIU and let them now how they can become involved in the university's future growth.

Notable alumni
FIU currently has over 250,000 alumni around the world in more than 30 countries. In conjunction with the Office of Alumni Relations, the Division of External Affairs publishes a quarterly news and alumni magazine, "FIU Magazine". FIU Magazine is distributed free of charge to all FIU alumni, faculty and donors.

References

Alumni associations of academic institutions